Lewisham Deptford is a parliamentary constituency represented in the House of Commons of the UK Parliament since 2015 by Vicky Foxcroft of the Labour Party.

History
This seat was created in 1974.  It has remained largely urban in its constituent areas which have been altered on reform by the Boundary Commission very lightly  overall.  The area of Deptford wholly within the seat was a major London dockyard and in its early history contained chandleries, repair yards, connected with the Royal Navy, later having a high concentration of London's expansive import and export wharves and warehouses; this extended well within the 2010-drawn confines of the seat towards New Cross which had major railway yards.

Political history
The seat has been won by three Members of Parliament, all of which were and remained during their public service members of the Labour Party.  The 2015 result made the seat the 23rd safest of Labour's 232 seats by percentage of majority and the 9th safest in the capital.

In the 2016 referendum to leave the European Union, the constituency voted remain by 75.4%.

Constituency profile
This constituency takes in Lewisham's northern tip – a short stretch alongside the Thames – along with the Deptford and New Cross districts, and the centre of Lewisham itself. These are historically some of the more deprived in London with high crime rates and social problems,. However, in the 21st century, counter to this, more upmarket housing developments are springing up as former industrial sites are cleared away. To the South East of the seat, Lewisham town centre adjoins Ladywell.

The area is relatively affordable, given the short commuting distance to Central London and Canary Wharf, via the Docklands Light Railway and South East Main Line. Goldsmiths, University of London and wider halls of residence make this a popular living area for those staying and studying in Greater London, giving a substantial student minority to the electorate.

At the Western extremity of the seat, just inside the current boundaries, is The Den, home to Millwall FC.

Lewisham Deptford has been one of Labour's safest London seats since its 1974 creation – it was the party's 25th safest in Britain at the 2001 election – though social change in the last decade has seen things become a little more competitive; the most popular opposition in 2005 and 2010 was formed by the active Liberal Democrat party in the area.  In terms of share of the vote, it received the 44th largest Labour vote in 2010, of the 650 constituencies.

Boundaries
1974–1983: The London Borough of Lewisham wards of Brockley, Deptford, Drake, Grinling Gibbons, Ladywell, Marlowe, and Pepys.

1983–2010: The London Borough of Lewisham wards of Blythe Hill, Crofton Park, Drake, Evelyn, Grinling Gibbons, Ladywell, Marlowe, and Pepys.

2010–present: The London Borough of Lewisham wards of Brockley, Crofton Park, Evelyn, Ladywell, Lewisham Central, New Cross, Telegraph Hill and part of Hither Green ward.

The constituency covers the northern and north-western parts of the London Borough of Lewisham.

The Fifth Periodic Review of Westminster constituencies which redrew this seat in 2010 also resulted in the creation of a new cross-borough constituency of Lewisham West and Penge which takes electoral wards from Lewisham and Bromley.

Members of Parliament

Election results

Elections in 2010s

Elections in 2000s

Elections in 1990s

Elections in 1980s

Elections in 1970s

See also 
 List of parliamentary constituencies in London

Notes

References

External links 
Politics Resources (election results from 1922 onwards)
Electoral Calculus (election results from 1955 onwards)

Politics of the London Borough of Lewisham
Parliamentary constituencies in London
Constituencies of the Parliament of the United Kingdom established in 1974
Deptford